The BAW Luba (陆霸) is a full-size SUV produced by the Chinese manufacturer BAW from 2001 to 2017.

Overview

The BAW Luba debuted in 2001 and is based on the platform of the Toyota Land Cruiser Prado (J90) or the Land Cruiser Prado produced from 1996 to 2002. Initially, power of the BAW Luba came from a 6-cylinder engine, produced by another BAIC subsidiary, with the design resembling the Toyota 5VZ 6-cylinder engine. Price range of the BAW Luba starts from 152,800 yuan and ends at 172,800 yuan before discontinuation.

News of a facelift was revealed in 2017 updating the front end design to be inline with the BAW Yusheng compact SUV.

Foreign markets
A version called the BAW Luba S100 was produced since 2009 with a pickup version of the BAW Luba called BAW Yueling launched. In Russia, the BAW Luba was sold under the name BAW Land King.

BAW Yueling pickup

The BAW Yueling pickup (越铃) is a pickup based on the BAW Luba SUV with a price range of 51,700 yuan to 75,800 yuan. The BAW Yueling pickup was available in two versions, including a standard version and a long version. The standard version features a 2.2 liter engine with a length of 5165 mm, a width of 1840 mm and a height of 1850 mm. The wheelbase is longer than the Luba at 3035 mm. The long version shares the width and height while being longer with a length of 5480 mm and a wheelbase of 3350 mm.

References

External links

BAW Official website

BAW vehicles
Cars introduced in 2001
Cars discontinued in 2017
2010s cars
Full-size sport utility vehicles
Front-wheel-drive vehicles
All-wheel-drive vehicles